Gerhard Ernst Spiegler (December 4, 1929 – August 24, 2015) was an American academic. He served as professor and president of Elizabethtown College, provost of Temple University and visiting professor at the University of Hamburg, Germany.

Biography
Spiegler also taught for eleven years, was provost and acting president at Haverford College, and taught at the University of California at Berkeley.

He retired as president of Elizabethtown College on August 31, 1996.

He won awards for Distinguished Research from the University of Chicago and Distinguished Teaching from the Danforth Foundation.

He was married to Ethel Spiegler, and had three adult children, Karin, Eric, and Mark.

Education 
 Ph.D. University of Chicago
 M.A. University of Chicago
 D.B. University of Chicago
 D.H.L. Elizabethtown College, 1996

References 
 Won Institute of Graduate Studies

External links 
 

2015 deaths
Presidents of Elizabethtown College
University of Chicago Divinity School alumni
1929 births